Miss Principessa d'Europa is an international pageant that currently selects the Italian representative for the Miss Europe World pageant. The pageant was first organized in 1999.

History 
Until 2014 when the competition was renamed Miss Principessa d'Europa, was called "Miss Reginetta d'Italia", the pageant was called "Miss Slide" as it was associated with the Italian magazine "Slide" which set up the competition. The Organiser and current patron of Miss Principessa d'Europa from 2010 is Devis Paganelli.

Since 2010, the contest has been one of four Italian beauty contests accredited by the Italian Fashion and Entertainment Professionals (Coordinamento Italiano Professionisti della Moda dello Spettacolo).

Miss Principessa d'Europa

Presenters 
 Gianluca Nasi - 1999
 Gianluca Nasi - 2009-2010-2011
 Nadia Bengala - 2011
 Gianluca Nasi - 2012-2013
 Nadia Bengala - 2014
 Gianluca Nasi- from 2015 to 2022

Official website
Concorso di Bellezza

References

Beauty pageants in Italy